Scott Davies may refer to:

Scott Davies (footballer, born 1987), English footballer playing for Tranmere Rovers
Scott Davies (footballer, born 1988), Irish footballer playing for Wealdstone FC
Scott Davies (cyclist), Welsh racing cyclist
Scott Davies (cricketer) in 2009 Indoor Cricket World Cup

See also
Scott Davie (disambiguation)
Scott Davis (disambiguation)